is a Japanese gymnast. He finished in eighteenth place in the all around at the 1996 Summer Olympics.

References

External links
 

1972 births
Living people
Japanese male artistic gymnasts
Olympic gymnasts of Japan
Gymnasts at the 1996 Summer Olympics
Sportspeople from Wakayama Prefecture
Asian Games medalists in gymnastics
Gymnasts at the 1994 Asian Games
Asian Games bronze medalists for Japan
Medalists at the 1994 Asian Games
20th-century Japanese people
21st-century Japanese people